is one of the 16 wards of the city of Nagoya in Aichi Prefecture, Japan. As of 1 October 2019, the ward had an estimated population of 143,913 and a population density of 3,153 persons per km². The total area was 45.64 km². It is geographically the largest of the wards of Nagoya in terms of land area.

Geography
Minato Ward is the southern portion of the city of Nagoya, in the coastal flatlands and river estuaries along the shore of Ise Bay. Due to land reclamation much of the coastline is no longer natural.

Surrounding municipalities
Atsuta Ward
Nakagawa Ward
Minami Ward
Tōkai
Kanie
Tobishima

History
All of what is now Minato Ward was part of the holdings of Owari Domain during the Edo period. After the Meiji Restoration, the area was transferred to the new Nagoya Prefecture, which later became part of Aichi Prefecture. Nagoya was divided into wards on April 1, 1908. In 1922, Ousu village in Aichi District was annexed by the city of Nagoya becoming part of Minami Ward. The Nagoya Port Drawbridge was completed in 1926. On October 1, 1937 the city of Nagoya was re-divided into ten wards, with the original Minami Ward divided into the new Minami Ward, plus Atsuta Ward, Nakagawa Ward, Minato Ward, and part of Showa Ward. In 1955, the town of Nanyo from Ama District was annexed by Minato Ward. In 1959, the Isewan Typhoon caused severe damage to the area.

Economy
The economy of Minato Ward is dominated by Nagoya Port, one of the busiest in Japan.

Education

International schools:
 Colégio Brasil Japão Prof. Shinoda - Brazilian school

The ward previously hosted Colégio Áureo, another Brazilian school.

Transportation

Ports
Nagoya Port

Railroads
Nagoya Seaside Rapid Railway - Aonami Line
 	
 
Meitetsu - Chikkō Line
  -  
Nagoya Municipal Subway – Meikō Line

Highways
Isewangan Expressway
Japan National Route 23 
Japan National Route 154 
Japan National Route 302

Local attractions
Port of Nagoya Public Aquarium
SCMaglev and Railway Park
Legoland Japan
 Nagoya Port Building
 Nagoya Port Sea Train Land
Nagoya Racecourse (Relocated to Yatomi in 2022)
Nagoya City Wilde Bird Observation Center

Local events
Marine Day Nagoya Port Festival, held annually at Nagoya Port from 1946, as part of the postwar development plan.  The festival is held on Marine Day.

References

Wards of Nagoya